Teemu Lepaus (born march 12, 1993) is a Finnish professional ice hockey player who plays for Bietigheim Steelers in the Deutsche Eishockey Liga (DEL). He also plays roller in-line hockey last time playing for Team Haippi winning the Finnish championships. He has also played for the Finnish men's team winning silver in 2017 world championships.

Playing career 
In the 2014–15 season Lepaus played in EHC Lustenau for 9 games. Lustenau won the INL championship that season. Lepaus also played in Suomi-sarja for Ketterä.

In the 2015-16 season Lepaus had moved to play for SaPKo in the finnish second-tier league, Mestis. He played 40 games and put up 22 points. 12 of those were goals.

The next season, 2016-17 Lepaus played for SaPKo for the last time. He played 48 games and made 62 points, but only 16 were goals. SaPKo won the Mestis championship and Lepaus got chosen in the all-star team. Lepaus had the most playoff-points (17) and the most assists (46). Lepaus was also chosen as the playoffs MVP.

For the next four seasons (2017-2021) Lepaus played in the finnish first-tier league, Liiga. He was in the roster of Ilves. Lepaus played 203 games in those four seasons and put up 104 points. 41 of those were goals.

In 2021 Lepaus signed a one-year contract with Porin Ässät. But he went to EHC Visp in the middle of the season.

Personal life 
Lepaus' retired brother Toni played ice hockey in Mestis. Lepaus played football in Ilves when he was a kid.

Career statistics

Roller in-line hockey 

Teemu Lepaus played in the 2017 roller in-line hockey championships for Finland men's national inline hockey team "Rullaleijonat". Teemu lepaus scored 22 points (tournaments best). Finland got 2nd place in the tournament.

In 2021 Lepaus was a part of Team Haippi in the Rullakiekon SM-liiga (finnish top tier roller in-line hockey league). They won the tournament without losing one game. The team had the following players: Teemu Lepaus, Alexander Barkov, Eemeli Suomi, Aleksi Heponiemi, Jonatan Tanus, Kristian Tanus, Patrik Puistola, Henrik Haapala, Anton Levtchi and Lassi Yrjölä.

References

External links

1993 births
Living people
Ässät players
SC Bietigheim-Bissingen players
Finnish ice hockey left wingers
Ilves players
Sportspeople from Tampere
EHC Visp players